Karre Mastanamma (10 April 1911 – 3 December 2018) was an Indian centenarian who became a popular chef on YouTube with millions of followers. At the time of her death in 2018, she had 2 million followers on YouTube. Despite having little knowledge of technology and only a basic education in rural Andhra Pradesh in southern India, Mastanamma, filmed by her grandson, became an Internet sensation following her first recording making a Baingan bharta (aubergine curry) in 2016. At the time of her death, she was the oldest YouTuber in the world.

External links
 Country Foods YouTube channel

References 

1911 births
2018 deaths
Indian centenarians
Indian chefs
Women centenarians
Indian YouTubers
Women chefs
Women from Andhra Pradesh